Hunting You is a 1929 German silent film directed by Ernst Angel.

The film's art direction was by Fritz Maurischat.

Cast
 Valerie Boothby
 Tanaroff Olek
 Hans Schweikart

References

Bibliography

External links

1929 films
Films of the Weimar Republic
German silent feature films
German black-and-white films
1920s German films